Christine Magnier (born 31 October 1968) is a French swimmer. She competed in two events at the 1988 Summer Olympics.

References

External links
 

1968 births
Living people
People from Villeparisis
French female backstroke swimmers
French female medley swimmers
Olympic swimmers of France
Swimmers at the 1988 Summer Olympics
Sportspeople from Seine-et-Marne